Oliva is a municipality in the comarca of La Safor in the Valencian Community, Spain. To its east lie  of coastline and beaches fronting the Mediterranean Sea, and eight kilometres to the north is Gandia.

The Passeig (promenade) runs through the centre of the town, and features a market each Friday. On the left side of the Marina beach is Kiko beach.

Oliva has one of the province's biggest and most colourful Moors and Christians Festivals (Festes de Moros i Cristians, in Valencian language) in the area. In the old town there are two churches, Sant Roc and Santa Maria la Major. Sant Roc dates from the 18th–19th centuries, and Santa Maria from the 17th–18th centuries. At the top of the hill in the old town is Santa Anna Castle, built in the 16th century.

In the centre of the village is a Roman kiln situated below one of the blocks of apartments on Santíssim street.

Oliva's Old Town has historical streets which see various "fiestas" celebrated throughout the year: the falles "Fiesta" in March, the Moors and Christians in July and Setmana Santa (Holy Week).

Economy
About 80% of the economy of Oliva is based on the tertiary sector, especially in commerce, shops, banks and tourism, currently there are more than 30 banks in Oliva.

The secondary sector makes up about 15% of the economy, with an extended industrial area, located outside of the city, in the south-east of Oliva.

The primary sector, makes up less than 5% of economy, with extended plantations of oranges and tangerines, and minor plantations of avocado, loquat, fig, banana, prickly pear, etc.

Demography

In 2011, Oliva had a population of 28,400 inhabitants, of which, 7466 (26.29%) of the population were immigrants, with the majority coming from Bolivia, Ecuador, Morocco, United Kingdom and Romania. 
In Oliva there are citizens of more than 50 countries, especially from South America, Europe, Africa and Asia

In 2011 the unemployment rate in the city was 9.7%

The median income of a person in Oliva in 2011 was €22,400  ($27,637.)

Climate
Oliva has a Mediterranean-Subtropical climate (Köppen climate classification: CSa), with more than 230 days above . The winters are mild and temperate whilst summers are hot and dry. In winter, during the cold waves, the minimum temperature can fall slightly under . Temperatures below the freezing mark and snow are almost unknown in Oliva. Temperatures may vary, however during heat waves which occur every year, the temperatures always exceed  and also can exceed . The wettest season is the autumn, while the driest season is the summer. Typically the city has more than 300 days in a year with clear skies.

Temperature and precipitation:

Notable people
 Francisco Brines, poet, National Prize for Spanish Literature
 David Fuster, footballer
 Enric Morera,  (3 April 1964) is a Spanish politician, leader of the Valencian Nationalist Bloc and the Compromís coalition.

References

External links

 Tourist website
 Oliva Tourist Guide website

Municipalities in the Province of Valencia
Safor